Davide Giazzon (born 16 January 1986 in Venice) is an Italian rugby union player. His preferred position is at Hooker, although he can also play at Prop. He currently plays for Zebre in the Pro12 and the Heineken Cup. He gained his first international cap in 2012 against Argentina as a sub, having previously played for Italy A and the Italian U-21 team.

References

External links
Overmach Rugby Parma Profile

1986 births
Living people
Sportspeople from Venice
Italian rugby union players
Rugby union hookers
Zebre Parma players
Aironi players
Italy international rugby union players